JS Tokiwa (AOE-423) is the second ship of the s of the Japanese Maritime Self-Defense Force. She was commissioned on 12 March 1990.

Construction and career
She is laid down on 12 May 1988 and launched on 23 March 1989. Commissioned on 12 March 1990 with the hull number AOE-423.

Gallery

References

External links

Ships of the Japan Maritime Self-Defense Force
Ships built by Hitachi Zosen Corporation
1989 ships
Towada-class replenishment ships